"How Did You Love" is a single by American rock band Shinedown. It is their fourth and final single from their fifth studio album, Threat to Survival.
The song was used in season 1 episode 2 of 9-1-1: Lone Star.

Background
Frontman Brent Smith said of the song's meaning in a Billboard article:

Charts

Weekly charts

Year-end charts

References

Shinedown songs
2015 songs
2016 singles
Atlantic Records singles
Songs written by Brent Smith
Songs written by Scott Stevens (singer)